Joeli Veitayaki (born 12 January 1967 in Matuku, Fiji) is a Fijian former rugby union player. His usual position was Prop. He debut for  against the New Zealand Maori in Christchurch on 4 June 1994. He played at the 1999 and 2003 Rugby World Cup. He has four daughters and two sons, Marilyn, Raijieli, Talei, Analie, Manawa and Haereiti Veitayaki.

His son Haereti Hetet has also followed in his father's footsteps in playing for the Flying Fijians at prop.

Veitayaki played for the Blues and Northland. He made his Super Rugby debut for the Blues against the Sharks in 1999. He also had a stint with Irish club Ulster.

References

External links

Fiji Rugby Profile
Blues Profile
Joeli Veitayaki at New Zealand Rugby History

1967 births
Fijian rugby union players
Fiji international rugby union players
Ulster Rugby players
Living people
Blues (Super Rugby) players
Northland rugby union players
Fijian expatriate rugby union players
Expatriate rugby union players in New Zealand
Expatriate rugby union players in Northern Ireland
Fijian expatriate sportspeople in New Zealand
Fijian expatriate sportspeople in Northern Ireland
People from Matuku Island
I-Taukei Fijian people
Rugby union props